Verden is a Kreis (district) in the centre of Lower Saxony, Germany. Adjoining it are (from the northwest clockwise) the districts of Osterholz, Rotenburg, Heidekreis, Nienburg, and Diepholz, as well as the city of Bremen.

Geography
The Aller River enters the district in the east and joins the Weser in the center of the district. In the north, the Wümme River passes from west to the east across the district's territory. The western half of the district is occupied by suburbs in the Bremen metropolitan area, e.g. the town of Achim.

History
The district dates back to the two Ämter of Verden and Achim, which were created in 1852 and 1859. After the Kingdom of Hanover became part of Prussia, they were recreated as districts (Kreis), and merged in 1932. In 1939, two municipalities of the district were added to Bremen, in 1972 Thedinghausen (previously an exclave of the district of Braunschweig) was added.

Twinnings
The city and rayon of Bagrationovsk (Russia)
The city and municipality of Górowo Ilaweckie (Poland)

Coat of arms

Towns and municipalities

References

External links

Official homepage

 
Districts of Lower Saxony